The 1863 Open Championship was the fourth Open Championship and was again held at Prestwick Golf Club. Eight professionals and six amateurs contested the event in wet and windy weather, with Willie Park, Sr. winning the championship for the second time, by two shots from Tom Morris, Sr.

As in previous years, the contest was held over three rounds of the twelve-hole links course. For the first time there was prize money for those finishing 2nd, 3rd and 4th, although the winner only received the Challenge Belt for the next year.

Davie Park, younger brother of Willie, led after the first round with a score of 55. An excellent second round 54 meant that Willie led by four strokes. Eventually Willie won by two strokes from Morris, spoiling Morris's attempt at a third consecutive win, which would have given him outright possession of the Challenge Belt, although Morris took the second prize of £5.

Final leaderboard
Source:

Friday, 18 September 1863

References

External links
Prestwick 1863 (Official site)

The Open Championship
Golf tournaments in Scotland
Open Championship
Open Championship
Open Championship